Vraneštica is a village in the municipality of Kičevo, North Macedonia. It was the seat of the now-defunct Vraneštica Municipality.

Demographics
According to the 2002 census, the village had a total of 438 inhabitants. Ethnic groups in the village include:

Macedonians 437
Serbs 1

References

Villages in Kičevo Municipality